When I Fall in Love... with Both is a 2000 Hong Kong anthology film consisting of three separate stories.  Directed by Samson Chiu, the film stars Hong Kong actresses Michelle Reis and Theresa Lee together with Singaporean actress Fann Wong.

Cast (in order of appearance)

Plot summary 

This feminist Hong Kong film comprises three separate stories telling of the predicament of modern women when they have more than one choice of a partner. In Singapore, Fann Wong is a reporter who falls for a shy baker (Peter Ho Yun-Tung) while she's seeing her suave co-worker (James Lye). Meanwhile, in Hong Kong, Theresa Lee is about to marry, but falls for her fiancé's twin brother (the two are played by twins James Chan and Sean Chan). And finally, in Macau, Michelle Reis is stuck between Alex Fong and David Wu, though not in the same way the other two women are.

Production notes 
 The film cost HKD$3 million to produce and film.
 The Hong Kong story was shot first, followed by the Macau story, and lastly, the Singapore story.
 While the Hong Kong and Macau stories were filmed using Cantonese dialogue, the actors in the Singapore story relied on Mandarin dialogue.
 In the final scene, Fann Wong and Theresa Lee meet up with David Wu in Macau.  The filming of that scene took three days.

External links 

 http://www.goldenharvest.com/fallinlove

2000 films
Hong Kong romantic drama films
2000s Hong Kong films